An  is a bead used in Japanese  (carrying cases). It is typically under an inch in length. It is used to fasten the cord of the  so that it does not unstack while carried.

Images

See also

References

External links 

Japanese art
Fashion accessories
Japanese words and phrases